The feudal barony of Cumbernauld was a feudal barony with its caput baronium originally at Cumbernauld Castle in North Lanarkshire, Scotland. The barony was granted to the Fleming family in 1314.

Citations

References
Douglas, Robert. The Peerage of Scotland; J. Almon (1767).

Barony of Cumbernauld
Barony of Cumbernauld
Barony of Cumbernauld
Cumbernauld
Cumbernauld
Barony of Cumbernauld
Lists of nobility
Barony of Cumbernauld
Scotland